Judge Barlow may refer to:

David Barlow (judge) (born 1971), judge of the United States District Court for the District of Utah
George H. Barlow (1921–1979), judge of the United States District Court for the District of New Jersey
Peter Townsend Barlow (1857–1921), magistrate judge in New York City, primarily of the Women’s Night Court
Stephen Steele Barlow (1818–1900), county judge of Sauk County, Wisconsin